Scrobipalpa macromaculata is a moth in the family Gelechiidae. It was described by Annette Frances Braun in 1925. It is found in North America, where it has been recorded from Utah and Washington.

References

Scrobipalpa
Moths described in 1925